The Case of Lady Camber may refer to:

  The Case of Lady Camber (play), a 1915 British play by Horace Annesley Vachell  
 The Case of Lady Camber (film), a 1920 British silent film directed by Walter West

See also
Further adaptations of the play
 Lord Camber's Ladies, a 1932 British film directed by Benn W. Levy 
 The Story of Shirley Yorke, a 1948 British film directed by Maclean Rogers